Shantilal Soni also referred as S. L. Soni (28 November 1930 – 2004) was a noted film director, producer and writer from Bombay. He was a Gujarati by birth. He has directed more than 22 films, starting his career in 1960 with (Sinhal Dweep Ki Sundari) and last one in 2007 (Aur Pappu Pass Ho Gaya). He was producer of 3 films and a writer of 2 films. He has directed films for Bollywood, Gujarati cinema and Bengali cinema.

Filmography
Sinhal Dweep Ki Sundari (1960)
Mr. X in Bombay (1964)
Aur Pappu Pass Ho Gaya (2007)

References

1930 births
2004 deaths
Film producers from Mumbai
20th-century Indian film directors
Indian male screenwriters
Hindi-language film directors
Gujarati-language film directors
Gujarati people
Film directors from Mumbai
20th-century Indian screenwriters
20th-century Indian male writers